Charles Scott Rogers (December 4, 1961 - November 27, 2020) was an American hiker.

Biography 
Rogers was born in Savannah, Georgia on December 4, 1961. He became an amputee following an accident with a shotgun on Memorial Day 1998.

Several media outlets, including CNN, Associated Press, and NBC, reported extensively on his 2004 hike. Duncan Mansfield, AP writer from Knoxville, Tennessee, coined the term "bionic hiker".

Rogers died on November 27, 2020, after having tetraplegia for 40 years.

References

1961 births
2020 deaths
People from Savannah, Georgia
Sportspeople from Georgia (U.S. state)
Hikers
American amputees
American disabled sportspeople